Peter C. Schultz, Ph.D. (born 1942), is co-inventor of the fiber optics now used worldwide for telecommunications. He is retired President (1988 to 2001) of Heraeus Tenevo Inc., a $200 million technical glass manufacturer specializing in fiber optics and semiconductor markets, and retired Chief Technical Officer North America for Heraeus Holding GmbH (the $6 billion German parent company).

In 2001, he was elected as a member into the National Academy of Engineering for invention and development of manufacturing methods and glass compositions for low-attenuation glass fibers for optical communication.

Biography

He was born in 1942 in Brooklyn to a Czech-American mother and German-American father. 

Schultz graduated in 1960 from Scotch Plains-Fanwood High School in Union County, New Jersey. He attended Rutgers University, where he earned a BS in Engineering.

He and his wife Mary Anne are residents of St. Thomas, USVI and have a second home in Essex, NY. They have four grown children and four grandchildren.

Academic career

He has taught at Cornell University (Visiting Professor Materials Science 1978-1984), George Washington University (Continuing Engineering Program Professor 1976-1994) and University of Virginia (Visiting Professor of Darden School 1988-1998).  He has extensive legal experience as an expert witness in patent defense.

Other activities

Since 2001 he has provided consulting services to several companies (including Intel, SEMATECH International, Yazaki, Furukawa, IMRA and SPI Lasers plc) and expert witness for several law firms, through Peter Schultz Consulting, LLC. He serves as senior advisor and board member of OFS (the Lucent fiber optics business unit acquired by Furukawa in 2001). He also serves as a board member of CBN Connect Inc., a non-profit company providing an open access broadband fiber-to-the-home system to the Adirondack region of NY.

He is also president of a start-up company (BioSensor Inc., founded in 1997) developing a non-invasive fiber optic sensor to measure blood glucose for diabetics, based on Russian technology. He is a member of the Selection Committee for the National Medal of Technology and a board member of the National Inventors Hall of Fame.
 
Peter Schultz holds 26 patents, has written over 20 research papers and is an expert in fused silica glasses.

Awards and honors
In 1993 he was inducted into the National Inventors Hall of Fame and in 2000 he received the National Medal of Technology from U.S. President Bill Clinton for this accomplishment (the highest technology award of the US government). He was elected to member of the National Academy of Engineering in 2001.
He is the recipient of numerous other awards including the International Glass Science Award (1977), SPIE Technology Achievement Award (1981), ASM Engineering Materials Achievement Award (1983), First American Innovators Award (US Dept. of Commerce 1995), Rutgers University Distinguished Alumni (2000), the Czech Gold Medal for Achievement (President Havel 2002), Fellow of the American Ceramic Society.

References

1942 births
Living people
National Medal of Technology recipients
Members of the United States National Academy of Engineering
People from Brooklyn
Scotch Plains-Fanwood High School alumni
People from Union County, New Jersey
Rutgers University alumni
Fiber optics
Fellows of the American Ceramic Society